Irie Révoltés was a music band from Heidelberg, Germany. Among its nine members, the brothers “Mal Élevé” and “Carlito” have French origins. For this reason many song lyrics are in French. The word “Irie” derives from the Jamaican creole language Patois and can be loosely translated with “positive” or “happy”, whereas “Révoltés” means "rebels" in French. Their songs have both French and German lyrics, which deal with controversial social issues. Their music is mainly influenced by genres like reggae, dancehall, ska, punk electro and hip-hop.

History and background

Irie Révoltés was founded in Heidelberg in 2000 and the current line up developed in the following years. With more than 500 concerts in 25 different countries such as Germany, Switzerland and Czech Republic, and has been playing on the main stages of Europe’s biggest music festivals. Irie Révoltés also performed regularly during demonstrations and charity events, in support of political and social projects. They have thus “earned a status comparable to that of Ton Steine Scherben”. In October 2016 the band announced to give their final concert which took place on 26 December in 2017.

Music 

The music of Irie Révoltés includes different genres. Among others, elements of reggae, dancehall, hip hop, ska and electro are essential to their style. Zeit ist Geld ("Time is Money") and Travailler ("Work") were first released in 2009 and anticipated their third LP Mouvement Mondial (August 2010). Compared with their previous records, these tracks show a clear musical evolution in terms of both sound and technical aspects. Rock and synth elements characterise this new sound. According to the critic, with this third album Iries Révoltés have achieved a personal style. The album ALLEZ was released in 2013 and at the end of their tour in 2014 in Heidelbeg, Mal Élevé announced a new publication for the next year. The album is titled Irie Révoltés and was released in June 2015.

Social commitment 

According to their own statement, Irie Révoltés aim at denouncing social ills while spreading positive energy with their music. They wants to encourage change through their socio-political engagement. Amongst other things, they support the project “Respekt!”, which fights against prejudice, racism, homophobia and sexism“ and are activists of “Viva con Agua de St.Pauli”, an association that works to bring clean drinking water to the “global South”. Songs as Viva con Agua and Walk with Us (ft. Gentleman) were written in order to make the concerns of the association heard. Irie Révoltés are also committed to individual actions. In autumn 2009, the band appeared several times during the Bildungsstreik (student mobilization) and supported the protest together with Chaoze One offering a song for free-download. To promote the initiative “Kein Platz für Rassismus” ("No Place for Racism"), which took place in Frankfurt, Irie Révoltés have written the song Viel zu tun (There's still much to do). Focus of their social commitment is “Rollis für Afrika”, brought into being by the front man Mal Élevé in 2003 in order to help people with disabilities in Senegal. The band promotes the project organizing charity concerts, information stands and through targeted actions. In spring 2012, Mal Élevé and Carlito were appointed members of the jury that first awarded the Youth Peace Prize of the German Association for the United Nations (DGVN). The prize acknowledges and promotes the engagements of young people in issues concerning the United Nations.

Discography

Studio albums 
 2003: Les deux côtés
 2006: Voyage
 2010: Mouvement mondial
 2012: Irie Révoltés Live [DVD & CD]
 2013: Allez
 2015: Irie Révoltés

Singles 
 2003: On assassine en afrique
 2005: Mouvement
 2006: Soleil
 2008: Viel zu tun
 2009: Zeit ist Geld
 2010: Merci
 2010: Il est là
 2010: Antifaschist
 2011: Travailler
 2013: Allez
 2013: Continuer
 2014: Résisdanse
 2015: Jetzt ist Schluss/Ruhe vor dem Sturm

Special releases 
 2006: Perspectives (Voices of Irie Révoltés & Chaoze One)
 2006: Kein Bock auf Nazis Samplerbeitrag: Viel zu tun
 2007: G8 illegal (Chaoze One feat. Mal Élevé)
 2007: Viva con Agua (freedownload Track mit Schmuf Hamburg feat. Toni-L)
 2009: Bildungsstreik (Voices of Irie Révoltés & Chaoze One)
 2013: Laut Sein! (Irie Révoltés feat. Iriepathie)
 2013: Allez! Beat Remix 2.0 (feat. Sookee)
 2014: Kein Bock auf Nazis Samplerbeitrag: Antifaschist

References

External links 

 Irie Révoltés Website
 offizielle Facebookseite von Irie Révoltés
 offizielle G+ Seite von Irie Révoltés
 Interview mit Irie Révoltés 11/2011

German hip hop groups
German reggae musical groups
German punk rock groups